This article is a list of notable people from the Australian regional city of Wagga Wagga, New South Wales.

Arts, literature
 Patricia Carlon (crime writer, born in Wagga Wagga)
 Flora Eldershaw (novelist and critic, educated and died in Wagga Wagga)
 Dame Edna Everage (fictional character)
 Billy Field (singer and songwriter)
 Dame Mary Gilmore (socialist, poet and journalist)
 Andrew Mueller (journalist, author)
 Nina Las Vegas (Nina Agzarian) (DJ and radio presenter)
 George Moore (radio presenter)

Business
 Geoff Dixon (Qantas CEO)
 Allan Fife (founder of Fife Capital)
 Don Kendell (founder of Kendell Airlines)
 Raelene Castle (Rugby Australia CEO) (2017-2020)

Crime
 Janine Balding (born and raised in Wagga Wagga, raped and murdered in Sydney in 1988)
 Andrew John Harper (the "Heartbreak Bandit" - defrauded and deceived women and business people)
 Arthur Orton (famous imposter claiming to be the Tichborne heir in late 19th century)

Film, television, and theatre
 Louise Alston (film director and producer)
 Sharna Burgess (professional ballroom dancer on Dancing with the Stars)
 Bill Kerr (actor)
 Lex Marinos (actor)
 Wayne Pygram (actor)
 Geraldine Quinn (performer)
 Kerry Casey (actor)

Military and policing
 Henry Baylis (first police magistrate of the area)
 Sir Thomas Blamey (World War II general and Australia's first and only Field-Marshal)
 John Hurst Edmondson (Australia's first World War II Victoria Cross recipient)

Music
 Carmel Kaine (Classical violinist)
 Sam Moran (former member of the children's musical group The Wiggles)

Politics and government
 Helen Coonan (former Liberal party senator for New South Wales 1996-2011)
 Charles Hardy (politician)
 Michael McCormack (Member for the Riverina, and Deputy Prime Minister)

Sport
 George P. Anderson (Australian rules footballer)
 David Barnhill (Rugby League footballer)
 Alex Blackwell (cricketer)
 Kate Blackwell (cricketer)
 Scobie Breasley (jockey)
 Greg Brentnall (Rugby League footballer)
 Wayne Carey (Australian rules footballer)
 Wayne Carroll (Australian rules footballer)
 Ben Cross (Rugby League footballer; played for Canberra, Melbourne and Newcastle)
 Neale Daniher (Australian rules footballer)
 Terry Daniher (Australian rules footballer)
 Patrick Dwyer (Olympic athlete)
 Steve Elkington (golfer)
 Marc Glanville (Rugby League footballer)
 Paul Hawke (Australian rules footballer)
 Elliott Himmelberg (Australian rules footballer)
 Harrison Himmelberg (Australian rules footballer)
 Nathan Hines (Rugby Union footballer)
 Brad Kahlefeldt  (2006 Commonwealth Games Triathlon gold medallist)
 Paul Kelly (Australian rules footballer)
 Geoff Lawson (cricketer)
 Jim Lenehan (Rugby Union footballer)
 Jack Littlejohn (Rugby League footballer)
 Steve Martin (Australian Rugby League Team)
 Bill Mohr (Australian rules footballer)
 Cameron Mooney (Australian rules footballer)
 Chris Mortimer (Rugby League footballer)
 Peter Mortimer (Rugby League footballer)
 Steve Mortimer (Rugby League footballer)
 Nigel Plum (Rugby League footballer)
 Alicia Quirk (Australian Women's Rugby sevens player and 2016 Summer Olympics gold medal winner)
 Tony Roche (tennis player)
 Adam Schneider (Australian rules footballer)
 Nathan Sharpe (Rugby Union footballer)
 Nick Skinner (Rugby League footballer)
 Michael Slater (cricketer)
 Jamie Soward (Rugby League footballer and coach)
 Peter Sterling (Rugby League footballer and TV presenter/sports commentator)
 Mark Taylor (cricketer)

Other
 William Monks (architect)
 Thomas Smith Bellair (actor and Wagga Wagga publican)

References 

Wagga Wagga
 
Lists of people from New South Wales